Tomorrow (previously known as The In Crowd and before that as Four Plus One) were an English musical group active in the 1960s, whose music touched on psychedelic rock, pop and freakbeat. Despite critical acclaim and support from DJ John Peel, who featured them on his "Perfumed Garden" radio show, the band was not a great success in commercial terms.  They were among the first psychedelic bands in England, along with Pink Floyd and Soft Machine. Tomorrow recorded the first ever John Peel show session on BBC Radio 1 on 21 September 1967. The band included Steve Howe on guitars, who would later join the British prog band Yes.

History

As The In Crowd, (not to be confused with the "Questions and Answers" In Crowd) they recorded the songs "Am I Glad to See You" and "Blow-Up" especially for the film Blowup in 1966. The lyric to "Blow-Up" is an almost-literal interpretation of the film's plot. The two songs remained unused however when the Yardbirds were hired to film the nightclub sequence that The In Crowd would have appeared in. 

As Tomorrow, they appeared in the 1967 film Smashing Time under the name of the Snarks. John "Junior" Wood was ill during shooting of the film and was replaced by John Pearce, a clothes dealer. Again, their music was not used in the film. Instead, the music used in the film is performed  by Skip Bifferty.

During 1967 the band released two singles, one of which, "My White Bicycle", was later covered by heavy rock act Nazareth, and as a novelty record by Neil the Hippy (Nigel Planer) of  the British sitcom The Young Ones. According to drummer John 'Twink' Alder, the song was inspired by the Dutch Provos, an anarchist group in Amsterdam which instituted a community bicycle program: "they had white bicycles in Amsterdam and they used to leave them around the town. And if you were going somewhere and you needed to use a bike, you'd just take the bike and you'd go somewhere and just leave it. Whoever needed the bikes would take them and leave them when they were done."

Tomorrow's September 1967 single "Revolution" preceded the Beatles song "Revolution" by a year. In Joe Boyd's book White Bicycles – Making Music in the 1960s he asserts the band's performance of the song one night at the UFO Club as the apotheosis of the '60s UK underground. Tomorrow also jammed with Jimi Hendrix at the UFO Club.  There was a long delay between their 1967 single releases and the eventual release of their self-titled album in February 1968, and the album would fail commercially. 

However the album has gained a cult following today, with reissues of the album gaining traction more than 50 years after its original release. Youtube postings of the album, as well as their unreleased tracks has also earned Tomorrow their cult status in the 60's and in music as a whole. Much like the music of bands like The   13th Floor Elevators, Kaleidoscope and July, who have all sparked a resurgence years after their music was mainly forgotten by the public, despite having no radio airplay after they disappeared, Tomorrow's self titled vinyl remains a treasure of the late 60's Psychedelic Era.

Tomorrow singer Keith West is perhaps better known as a participant in Mark Wirtz's A Teenage Opera project that gave him the solo hit single "Excerpt from 'A Teenage Opera' (Grocer Jack)" and brief commercial success in 1967. Guitarist Steve Howe later joined progressive rock band Yes, whilst Twink joined the Pretty Things in order to complete their concept album, S.F. Sorrow, before forming the Pink Fairies. John Wood (not to be confused with Sound Techniques producer) sometimes played bass with Jeff Beck.

In 2021, the official biography of Keith West was published in the book "Thinking About Tomorrow – Excerpts from the life of Keith West".

Discography

Albums
Tomorrow (Parlophone, February 1968)
50 Minute Technicolor Dream (RPM 184, 1998)

Singles
As The In Crowd:
"That's How Strong My Love Is" / "Things She Says" (single, Parlophone R5276, April 1965) – UK No. 48
"Stop, Wait a Minute" / "You're on Your Own" (single, Parlophone R5328, September 1965)
"Why Must They Criticise" / "I Don't Mind" (single, Parlophone R5364, November 1965)

As Tomorrow:
"My White Bicycle" (Hopkins/Burgess)/ "Claramount Lake" (single, Parlophone R5597, May 1967)
"Revolution" (Hopkins/Howe) / "Three Jolly Little Dwarfs" (single, Parlophone R5627, September 1967) – UK No. 56

Notes

References

External links
BBC John Peel - Tomorrow
1999 Interview with Steve Howe, talking about his days with Tomorrow
Tomorrow at AllMusic

English psychedelic rock music groups
Musical groups established in 1967
Parlophone artists
Sire Records artists